Absolutely Live is a live album by musician Rod Stewart. It was released as a double–LP in 1982. The subsequent CD version omitted the tracks "The Great Pretender" and "Guess I'll Always Love You" in order to fit the album onto a single disc. The liner notes state that there are no overdubs on this live album.

Track listing

Side A
 "The Stripper" – 0:10
 "Tonight I'm Yours" – 4:10
 "Sweet Little Rock and Roller" – 4:25
 "Hot Legs" – 4:52
 "Tonight's the Night (Gonna Be Alright)" – 4:23
 "The Great Pretender" – 3:34 (not on the CD version)

Side B
 "Passion" – 5:04
 "She Won't Dance with Me / Little Queenie" – 4:34
 "You're in My Heart (The Final Acclaim)" – 4:34
 "Rock My Plimsoul" – 4:24

Side C
 "Young Turks" – 5:28
 "Guess I'll Always Love You" – 4:51 (not on the CD version)
 "Gasoline Alley" – 2:15
 "Maggie May" – 5:08
 "Tear It Up" – 3:26

Side D
 "Da Ya Think I'm Sexy?" – 6:04
 "Sailing" – 4:45
 "I Don't Want to Talk About It" – 4:34
 "Stay with Me" – 5:34

Personnel

Band members
Rod Stewart – vocals, producer, mixing
Jim Cregan – guitars, backing vocals, mixing
Robin Le Mesurier – guitars, backing vocals
Wally Stocker – guitars
Kevin Savigar – piano, keyboards, backing vocals
Jimmy Zavala – harmonicas, saxophones, keyboards, bells
Jay Davis – bass, backing vocals
Tony Brock – drums

Guest musicians
Kim Carnes, Tina Turner – vocals on "Stay with Me"

Production
George Tutko – engineer, mixing
Ricky DeLena – assistant engineer

Charts

References

1982 live albums
Warner Records live albums
Rod Stewart live albums